Penicillium thiersii is a species of fungus in the genus Penicillium which was isolated from a wood decay fungi (Hypoxylon) in Wisconsin in North America. Penicillium thiersii produces thiersindole A, thiersindole B, thiersindole C, oxalicine A and oxalicine B

References

Further reading 

thiersii
Fungi described in 2004